"You Don't Bring Me Flowers" is a song written by Neil Diamond with Alan and Marilyn Bergman for the daily TV sitcom All That Glitters. The song was intended to be the theme song, but Norman Lear, the show's creator, changed the concept of the show and the song was no longer appropriate. Diamond then expanded the track from 45 seconds to 3:17, adding instrumental sections and an additional verse. The Bergmans contributed to the song's lyrics, which tell the story of two lovers who have drifted apart while they "go through the motions" and heartache of life together.

In 1977, Diamond released the album I'm Glad You're Here with Me Tonight, which included the track "You Don't Bring Me Flowers" as a solo performance. Early in 1978, Barbra Streisand covered the song on her album Songbird. These recordings were spliced together by different radio stations, creating unofficial duets, the success of which led to the studio bringing them together for an official duet recording, which reached number one on the Billboard Hot 100 in December 1978.

Duet version created
The roots of the duet version, as chronicled in myriad Streisand and Diamond biographies, as well as Streisand's Just for the Record... box set, revolve around WAKY (AM) Louisville, KY program director, Gary Guthrie, who spliced the two solo tracks together as a going-away present to his wife, Becky, whom he was in the process of divorcing. Guthrie's spliced-together duet version first aired on WAKY on May 24, 1978.

As the real-life story behind the song unfolded, it triggered a media buzz worldwide, from Good Morning America and People magazine to the BBC. Meanwhile, a different version was prepared by Chicago's WGN radio personality Roy Leonard and producer Peter Marino. Streisand's album was placed on one turntable and Diamond's on another, and the recording was mixed 'live'. They began with Streisand singing and Diamond's vocal followed. Streisand and Diamond repeated the same lyrics back and forth to each other—there weren't any edits, and the recording was mixed in one take. The Roy Leonard Show version became so popular that years after Columbia Records released their official duet, listeners continued to call in requesting to hear the WGN version.

Radio personalities Jack Hood and Gene Kruszewski of WJR-AM/Detroit also created a duet version of the song, which was a local and regional hit and helped escalate the song's novelty.

Interest in the unofficial versions of the duet caused a clamor on the retail level, as the song was commercially unavailable as a duet. Guthrie sent CBS his version of the duet on July 27, and by August 3, both Streisand and Diamond had agreed to the release of a duet version. However, rather than issue any of the spliced-together versions, Columbia Records had Streisand and Diamond record a brand-new "official" studio version, which was released on October 17, 1978. The song reached number one on the Hot 100 chart for two non-consecutive weeks in December 1978, Producing the third number-one hit for both singers. The single sold over one million copies, and eventually went Platinum.

Record World said that "the song is perfect for both vocalists."

In 1979, Guthrie sued CBS for $5 million, claiming that he was improperly compensated for his role in making the song a hit. The parties reached an out-of-court settlement. Acknowledgment and gratitude for Guthrie also came from CBS with a Gold record plaque, flowers from Diamond, and a telegram from Streisand.

Columbia also presented gold records to both Leonard and Marino, for creating the WGN version,and to Hood and Kruszewski for their WJR version. The solo versions had also drawn attention from other radio stations, resulting in other radio personalities receiving recognition for helping to increase the popularity of a “spliced” duet, further contributing to the decision to create an official duet.

The duo performed the songannouncedto close the 1980 Grammy Awards show, a performance released on the 1994 album Grammy's Greatest Moments Volume I. The story of how it happened was recalled by Alicia Keys on the CBS network television special, My Night at the Grammys, which aired on November 30, 2007. Keys said, “It might very well have been the first Grammy moment ... they [had] never performed the song “live” together, so on February 27, 1980, the lights dimmed at the Shrine Auditorium and Barbara and Neil took the stage to sing one of the classic television duets of all time.”

Diamond and Streisand had planned to star in a motion picture based on the song, but such plans were cancelled when Diamond starred in a remake of The Jazz Singer (1980).

Chart history

Weekly charts

Year-end charts

All-time charts

Certifications

Jim Ed Brown and Helen Cornelius version
Concurrent with the success of Diamond and Streisand's version of the song, country singers Jim Ed Brown and Helen Cornelius released a country version of the song, which reached number ten on the Billboard Hot Country Singles chart in early 1979.

See also
 List of Hot 100 number-one singles of 1978 (U.S.)

References 

Songs about flowers
1977 songs
1978 singles
Neil Diamond songs
Barbra Streisand songs
Jim Ed Brown songs
Helen Cornelius songs
Billboard Hot 100 number-one singles
Cashbox number-one singles
RPM Top Singles number-one singles
Songs with music by Michel Legrand
Songs with lyrics by Alan Bergman
Songs with lyrics by Marilyn Bergman
Songs written by Neil Diamond
Song recordings produced by Bob Gaudio
Male–female vocal duets
Pop ballads
Columbia Records singles